Stirling Road is an east-west commuter highway in Broward County, Florida, designated State Road 848 (SR 848) and County Road 848 (CR 848). The road's western terminus is at an intersection with SW 166th Ave in Southwest Ranches. At University Drive (SR 817) in Davie, the county road designation ends and the state road designation begins, and the road continues east to Federal Highway (U.S. Route 1 or US 1) in downtown Dania Beach.

Route description
Stirling Road begins at SW 166th Ave in Southwest Ranches with the hidden designation of County Road 848 and continues east through the cities of Southwest Ranches, Cooper City and Davie. Stirling Road also has several other, disconnected, sections between the dead end and US 27 (SR 25).

State Road 848 begins at Stirling Road's intersection with University Drive (SR 817) in Davie. The road then goes east, entering the Hollywood Seminole Indian Reservation after it crosses over Florida's Turnpike (SR 91) without an interchange. After the intersection with US 441/SR 7 in Hollywood at the eastern end of the Hollywood Seminole Indian Reservation, SR 848 takes Stirling Road east as a four lane divided highway, through mostly residential areas, scattered with commercial businesses. East of the intersection with Lakeshore Drive, Stirling Road forms the southern boundary with Dania Beach, as the road becomes more commercial, quickly approaching the interchange with Interstate 95 (I-95). At the southeast corner of the interchange with I-95 (SR 9) was the site of Six Flags Atlantis, a water park that was in existence in the 1980s and early 1990s. After the closing and demolition of the park, the Oakwood Plaza shopping center was built in its place. Just east of the shopping center, Stirling Road crosses a canal and leaves Hollywood and enters Dania Beach, through more commercial establishments before terminating at US 1.

Major intersections

References

External links

848
848